This is a list of settlements in Aetolia-Acarnania, Greece.

 Achladokastro
 Achyra
 Aetopetra
 Aetos
 Afrato
 Afroxylia
 Agalianos
 Agia Paraskevi
 Agia Sofia
 Agia Varvara
 Agios Andreas
 Agios Dimitrios
 Agios Georgios
 Agios Ilias
 Agios Konstantinos
 Agios Nikolaos Trichonidos
 Agios Nikolaos
 Agios Thomas
 Agios Vlasios
 Agrampela
 Agridi
 Agrinio
 Aitoliko
 Akres
 Alevrada
 Amfilochia
 Amorgianoi
 Ampelaki
 Ampelakiotissa
 Ampelia
 Amvrakia
 Analipsi
 Anavryti
 Angelokastro
 Ano Chora
 Ano Kerasovo
 Ano Koudouni
 Ano Vasiliki
 Anoixiatiko
 Anthofyto
 Antirrio
 Arachova
 Archontochori
 Argyro Pigadi 
 Aspria
 Astakos
 Avarikos
 Bampalio
 Bampini
 Chaliki Amvrakias
 Chalkiopoulo
 Chomori
 Chouni
 Chrysovergi
 Chrysovitsa
 Chrysovitsa
 Dafni
 Dafnias
 Dendrochori
 Diasellaki
 Diplatanos
 Dokimi
 Dorvitsa
 Drymonas
 Drymos
 Elaiofyto
 Elatou
 Elatovrysi
 Eleftheriani
 Ellinika
 Empesos
 Evinochori
 Famila
 Floriada
 Fragkoulaiika
 Fyteies
 Galatas
 Gavalou
 Gavrolimni
 Gavros
 Giannopouloi
 Gouria
 Gouriotissa
 Grammatikou
 Grammeni Oxya
 Grigori
 Kainourgio
 Kalavrouza
 Kallithea
 Kalloni
 Kaloudi
 Kalyvia
 Kamaroula
 Kandila
 Kapsorachi
 Karaiskakis
 Kastanea
 Kastanoula
 Kastraki
 Katafygio
 Kato Chora
 Kato Chrysovitsa
 Kato Kerasovo
 Kato Makrinou
 Katochi
 Katouna
 Kechrinia
 Kentriki
 Kerasea
 Kleisorrevmata
 Klepa
 Kokkinochori
 Kokkinovrysi
 Kompoti
 Koniska
 Konopina
 Kryoneria
 Kydonea
 Kyparissos
 Kypseli
 Kyra Vgena
 Lampiri
 Lefka
 Lefko
 Lepenou
 Lesini
 Limnitsa
 Livadaki
 Loutraki
 Loutro
 Lygias
 Lysimacheia
 Machairas
 Makrinou
 Makyneia
 Malesiada
 Mamoulada
 Manina Vlizianon
 Mandrini
 Mastro
 Mataragka
 Matsouki
 Megali Chora
 Megas Kampos
 Menidi
 Mesarista
 Milea
 Missolonghi
 Molykreio
 Monastiraki
 Mousoura
 Myrtea
 Mytikas
 Naupactus
 Nea Avorani
 Neapoli
 Neochori, Missolonghi
 Neochori, Nafpaktia
 Neokastro
 Nerochori
 Neromanna
 Ochthia
 Palaiochoraki
 Palaiokarya
 Palaiomanina
 Palaiopyrgos
 Palairos
 Paliampela
 Pamfio
 Panagoula
 Panaitolio
 Pantanassa
 Papadates
Papadatou
 Paravola
 Patiopoulo
 Pentakorfo
 Pentalofo
 Peratia
 Perdikaki
 Perdikovrysi
 Perista
 Peristeri
 Perithori
 Perkos
 Petrochori
 Petrona
 Pitsinaiika
 Plagia
 Platanos
 Podogora
 Podos
 Pogonia
 Pokista
 Potamoula Messolongiou
 Potamoula
 Prodromos
 Prosilia
 Psilovrachos
 Retsina
 Rigani
 Riganio
 Sardinia
 Sargiada
 Sidira
 Simos
 Sitaralona
 Sitomena
 Skala
 Skourtou
 Skoutera
 Skoutesiada
 Spartias
 Sparto
 Spolaita
 Stamna
 Stanos
 Stathas
 Stranoma
 Stratos
 Strongylovouni
 Stylia
 Terpsithea
 Thermo 
 Thyrio
 Trichonio
 Triklino
 Trikorfo
 Tryfos
 Varetada
 Varnakas
 Vasiliki
 Vasilopoulo
 Vatos
 Velvina
 Vlachomandra
 Vliziana
 Vomvokou
 Vonitsa
 Vrouviana
 Xiropigado
 Zevgaraki

By municipality

See also
List of towns and villages in Greece

 
Aetolia-Acarnania